Tupeyevo (Tıpıy) is a rural locality (a village) in Urmetovsky Selsoviet, Ilishevsky District, Bashkortostan, Russia. The population was 415 as of 2010. There are 5 streets.

Geography 
Tupeyevo is located 29 km southwest of Verkhneyarkeyevo (the district's administrative centre) by road. Taktagulovo is the nearest rural locality.

References 

Rural localities in Ilishevsky District